Richard Bernstein (born July 30, 1966 in Brooklyn, New York) is an American bass. He is currently a member of the Metropolitan Opera; 2018–19 is his 24th consecutive season with the company; he sang his 400th Met performance on January 27, 2018 and has been a part of more than 125 international live broadcasts with the company.

The 2018/19 season with the Metropolitan Opera he performed Pistola in Falstaff, Zuniga in Carmen, Bello in La Fanciulla del West, 2nd Armored Man in The Magic Flute and Commissioner #2 in Dialogues des Carmélites while also covering roles in Gianni Schicchi, Samson et Dalila, Adriana Lecouvrer, Tosca and Siegfried.

In the 2017/18 season with the Metropolitan Opera, Mr. Bernstein performed in Die Zauberflöte – both the full-length opera in German and a family-friendly abridged version in English – Tosca and Parsifal, while also covering roles Le nozze di Figaro, Elektra, Roméo et Juliette, and the American premiere of Thomas Adès’s The Exterminating Angel (new production). In addition he performed the role of Angelotti in Tosca with The Philadelphia Orchestra under the baton of Maestro Yannick Nézet-Séguin, bass soloist in Beethoven’s magisterial Ninth Symphony with the New Jersey Choral Society, and returned to one of his touchstone roles: Leporello in Don Giovanni, at Chautauqua Opera.

Early life
He grew up in Brooklyn, New York, with his three siblings, all of whom have followed artistic pursuits, and spent his high school years in Colorado. He attended the University of Southern California and graduated with a Bachelor of Music degree in vocal performance. His sister is the actress Didi Conn.

Career
After his graduation from college, Bernstein joined the Los Angeles Opera's Resident Artist Program. He became a recurring face with the L.A. Opera for a number of years, performing in several productions in the late 1990s and early 2000s. He began his career as a bass-baritone and made a reputation for himself not only for the burnished tone of his voice, but the physicality of his performing (as noted in an early Opera News profile).

In December 1995, he made his European debut as Orest in Elektra in a high-profile concert version in Valencia with the soprano Leonie Rysanek. Other notable concert debuts include his Chicago Symphony Orchestra debut at the Ravinia Festival in July 1998 (soloist in Beethoven's Symphony No. 9), and his Carnegie Hall debut singing the Verdi Requiem in May 1999.

The title role in Mozart's Le nozze di Figaro (The Marriage of Figaro) has been a career-defining role for Bernstein. He made his Lyric Opera of Chicago debut in the role as a last-minute substitute for Bryn Terfel in 1998, and has sung the opera in several major houses, including at the Metropolitan Opera, Los Angeles Opera, Bayerische Staatsoper (his German debut), and the Teatro Maggio Musicale in Firenze (his Italian debut, with Zubin Mehta conducting).

He made his Metropolitan Opera debut in October 1995 as Zuniga in Carmen and has performed 381 times with the company, including several Live in HD broadcasts (broadcast live into movie theaters internationally). His repertoire with the company includes roles in operas ranging from Tosca and La bohème to Das Rheingold to From the House of the Dead, Wozzeck and Jenufa.

His repertoire in general spans a number of styles and languages, from the bel canto of Rossini (Mustafà in L'italiana in Algeri) to classic French opera (Sancho Panza in Don Quichotte) to 20th-century works such as Benjamin Britten's Albert Herring (Superintendent Budd). He has also sung three of the four lower-voice roles in Mozart's Don Giovanni – Leporello, Masetto, and the title character – including one memorable concert version performed in Bellingham, WA, where he performed both Leporello and Masetto in the same evening. The original Masetto cancelled at the last minute due to illness; Bernstein, scheduled to sing Leporello, volunteered to sing both roles, which he did without a score and semi-staged.

Other roles, past and present, include: Daland in Der fliegende Holländer, Méphistophélès in both Gounod's Faust and Berlioz's La damnation de Faust; Prince Gremin in Eugene Onegin, Colline in La bohème; Escamillo in Carmen; Alidoro in 
La Cenerentola; Raimondo in Lucia di Lammermoor; the Four Villains and Crespel in Les contes d'Hoffmann; Don Basilio in Il barbiere di Siviglia; Ferrando in Il trovatore; and Banquo in Macbeth.

Among the opera companies, orchestras, and festivals with which he has sung are: Seattle Opera, Ravinia Festival, Théâtre du Capitole (Toulouse), Opera Company of Philadelphia, Tanglewood Festival, Boston Symphony Orchestra, New York Philharmonic, San Diego Opera, Vancouver Opera, and Deutsche Oper Berlin.

Contemporary American repertoire
Contemporary American opera has played a significant role in Bernstein's career, which includes two world premieres. At Dallas Opera in the 2001–02 season, he created the role of Laurent, the lover (and murder accomplice) of the title character in Thérèse Raquin by Tobias Picker. In 2002–03, Bernstein was featured as Marco in the Metropolitan Opera premiere of William Bolcom's A View From the Bridge, a role he reprised for Washington Opera in 2007–08.

Next, he created the role of determined prosecutor Orville Mason in Picker's An American Tragedy (based on the Theodore Dreiser novel), which had its world premiere at the Metropolitan Opera in the 2006–07 season. He assumed the role of Lord Krishna in the Met Opera premiere of Philip Glass's opera Satyagraha – a performance he recreated for the Met's Live in HD international broadcast in 2011. Other modern American roles include Frank Maurrant and Olin Blitch from the classic American repertoire pieces Street Scene and Susannah, respectively.

Recordings

DVD appearances
 Bello in La fanciulla del West with the Metropolitan Opera (Deutsche Grammophon)
 Pietro in Simon Boccanegra with the Metropolitan Opera (Sony)
 2nd Soldier in Salome with the Metropolitan Opera (Sony)
 Captain in Manon Lescaut with the Metropolitan Opera (EMI)
 Zaretski in Eugene Onegin a Grammy-nominated recording (2009, Best Opera Recording) (Decca)
 Zaretski in Eugene Onegin with the Metropolitan Opera (2014) (Deutsche Grammophon)
 A Murderer in Macbeth with the Metropolitan Opera (Deutsche Grammophon)

Audio recordings
 Laurent in Tobias Pickers's Thérèse Raquin on Chandos Records
 Bass Soloist on John Axelrod's How do I love Thee on Marquis Music label

Video recordings
 Zuniga in Carmen with the Metropolitan Opera

References

External links
 Richard Bernstein's Website
 Metropolitan Opera Archives website (searchable performance history)
 Richard Bernstein's profile on Lombardo Associates website
 Seattle Opera Blog interview (Don Quichotte), March 4, 2011
 Parterre box 1999 interview

Living people
American operatic basses
Musicians from Brooklyn
1966 births
Singers from New York City
USC Thornton School of Music alumni
20th-century American male opera singers
Classical musicians from New York (state)
21st-century American male opera singers